A moratorium is a delay or suspension of an activity or a law. In a legal context, it may refer to the temporary suspension of a law to allow a legal challenge to be carried out.

For example, animal rights activists and conservation authorities may request fishing or hunting moratoria to protect endangered or threatened animal species.  These delays, or suspensions, prevent people from hunting or fishing the animals in discussion.

Another instance is a delay of legal obligations or payment (debt moratorium). A legal official can order  due to extenuating circumstances, which render one party incapable of paying another.

See also

Justice delayed is justice denied
Moratorium (disambiguation)

References

Legal terminology